Andreas Thomas Carlson (born 13 February 1987) is a Swedish politician for the Christian Democrats. Since 18 October 2022 he is the minister of infrastructure in the Ulf Kristersson cabinet.

References

1987 births
Living people
Christian Democrats (Sweden) politicians
Swedish Ministers for Housing
Swedish Ministers for Infrastructure